Słonecznik  (German Sonnenborn) is a village in the administrative district of Gmina Morąg, within Ostróda County, Warmian-Masurian Voivodeship, in northern Poland.

The village has an approximate population of 1,000.

References

Villages in Ostróda County